The 2015–16 Texas–Arlington Mavericks men's basketball team represented the University of Texas at Arlington during the 2015–16 NCAA Division I men's basketball season. The Mavericks, led by tenth year head coach Scott Cross, played their home games at the College Park Center and were a member of the Sun Belt Conference. They finished the season 24–11, 13–7 in Sun Belt play to finish in third place. They defeated Texas State to advance to the semifinals of the Sun Belt tournament where they lost to Louisiana–Monroe. They were invited to the CollegeInsider.com Tournament where they defeated Savannah State in the first round (the Mavericks' first ever post-season win in any tournament), received a second round bye and lost in the quarterfinals to NJIT.  The 24 wins tied the 2011 team for most in a single Maverick season.

Roster

Schedule

|-
!colspan=9 style="background:#0064b1; color:white;"| Summer Tour of the Bahamas

|-
!colspan=9 style="background:#0064b1; color:white;"| Regular season

|-
!colspan=9 style="background:#0064b1; color:white;"| Sun Belt tournament

|-
!colspan=9 style="background:#0064b1; color:white;"| CIT

References

UT Arlington Mavericks men's basketball seasons
Texas-Arlington
Texas-Arlington
2015 in sports in Texas
2016 in sports in Texas